Wildflower Preserve may refer to:

 Wildflower Preserve (Florida), an 80-acre preserve on the Cape Haze peninsula in Charlotte County
 Missimer Wildflower Preserve, a protected native grassland in Napa County, California
 Bowman's Hill Wildflower Preserve, a nature preserve, botanical garden and museum
 Van Hoosear Wildflower Preserve, a private nature reserve on Carriger Creek in southern Sonoma County, California 
 Cylburn Arboretum, formerly the Cylburn Wildflower Preserve and Garden Center from 1954 until 1982
 Ridges Sanctuary, a 16,00 acre wildflower preserve in Baileys Harbor, Wisconsin 
 Holtwood Arboretum, a recreation area, arboretum, and wildflower preserve located on New Village Road (off Route 372), in Lancaster County, Holtwood, Pennsylvania 
 Sand Ridge Wildflower Preserve
 Todmorden Mills Wildflower Preserve
 Slaterville Wildflower Preserve
 Van Hoosear Wildflower Preserve
 Shenks Ferry Wildflower Preserve
 Stonebrook, a documented pre-glacial Missouri wildflower preserve